Virginia's 31st Senate district is one of 40 districts in the Senate of Virginia. It has been represented by Democrat Barbara Favola since 2012, succeeding retiring fellow Democrat Mary Margaret Whipple.

Geography
District 31 stretches along the Potomac River in parts of Arlington, Fairfax, and Loudoun counties, including some or all of McLean, Langley, Great Falls, and Lowes Island. The sections of Arlington covered include the neighborhoods of Arlington Forest, Arlington View, Ballston, Cherrydale, Clarendon, Courthouse,  Glen Carlyn,  Lyon Village,  Rosslyn, Virginia Square and Westover.

The district overlaps with Virginia's 8th and 10th congressional districts, and with the 34th, 47th, 48th, 49th, and 86th districts of the Virginia House of Delegates. It lies directly across the river from Maryland and the District of Columbia.

Recent election results

2019

2015

2011

Federal and statewide results in District 31

Historical results
All election results below took place prior to 2011 redistricting, and thus were under different district lines.

2007

2003

1999

1995

District officeholders

References

Virginia Senate districts
Arlington County, Virginia
Government in Fairfax County, Virginia
Government in Loudoun County, Virginia